The Black Balloon is a 1979 album by John Renbourn.

Track listing
All tracks are Traditional; arranged by John Renbourn; except where noted.
"The Moon Shines Bright" – 3:56
"The English Dance" – 2:51
"Bourrée I and II" – 2:22
"Medley:" – 9:28
"The Mist Covered Mountains of Home"
"The Orphan"
"Tarboulton"
"The Pelican" (John Renbourn) – 7:04
"The Black Balloon" (John Renbourn) – 11:34

Personnel
John Renbourn - acoustic and electric guitar
Tony Roberts - flute
Stuart Gordon - snare, tabors
Technical
Bob Wagner - sleeve design
Stefan Grossman - photography

References

Black Balloon
Black Balloon
Transatlantic Records albums